Mael Ísu Ua Brolcháin (died 1086), Irish churchman and writer.

Biography

A member of a high-class ecclesiastical family in what is now Donegal, "genealogical sources give his father as Máel Brigte  and his three brothers as Áed, Diarmait, and Muirecan."

Besides holding a number of benefices and wielding considerable political influence, he was the author of the poem To an Elderly Virgin. He died as a member of the religious community of Armagh in 1086, recorded as being the chief sage of Ireland.

Members of his lineage served as Bishop of Derry.

Works
His best-known work is a Latin and Irish hymn, Deus Meus Adiuva Me. Here are the modern Irish lyrics. For a translation by Professor Gerard Murphy of this well-loved piece see link below:

Deus meus adiuva me
Tabhair dom do shearch, a Mhic ghil Dé
Tabhair dom do shearch, a Mhic ghil Dé
Deus meus adiuva me.

Domine da quod peto a te,
Tabhair dom go dian a ghrian ghlan ghlé,
Tabhair dom go dian a ghrian ghlan ghlé,
Domine da quod peto a te.

Domine, Domine, exaudi me,
M’anam bheith lán de d’ghrá, a Dhé,
M’anam bheith lán de d’ghrá, a Dhé,
Domine, Domine exaudi me.

For translation see Deus Meus, Adiuva Me and live version sung with harp

References

Sources

 pp. 48–50; 396, The New Oxford Book of Irish Verse, edited, with translations, by Thomas Kinsella, 1986.

11th-century Irish priests
1086 deaths
Irish Christian monks
11th-century Irish writers
People from County Donegal
11th-century Irish poets
Year of birth unknown
Irish male poets
Medieval Gaels from Ireland
Irish-language writers